Eduardo Toba Muíño (14 May 1923 – 1 August 2001) was a Spanish football manager. 

Toba coached Deportivo de La Coruña, Real Oviedo, Costa Rica, CS Herediano, Tenerife, Córdoba, Hércules and Spain .

References

1923 births
2001 deaths
Spanish football managers
Spanish expatriate football managers
Deportivo de La Coruña managers
Real Oviedo managers
Costa Rica national football team managers
C.S. Herediano managers
CD Tenerife managers
Córdoba CF managers
Hércules CF managers
Spain national football team managers
Spanish expatriate sportspeople in Costa Rica